The 2013 United States state legislative elections were held on November 5, 2013. Three legislative chambers in two states held regularly-scheduled elections. These off-year elections coincided with other state and local elections, including gubernatorial elections in two states.

Legislative elections were held for the New Jersey Senate, New Jersey General Assembly, and the Virginia House of Delegates. In New Jersey, Democrats retained control of their majorities in the Senate and General Assembly. Republicans held a majority in the Virginia House of Delegates.

Summary table 
Regularly-scheduled elections were held in 3 of the 99 state legislative chambers in the United States. Nationwide, regularly-scheduled elections were held for 220 of the 7,383 legislative seats. This table only covers regularly-scheduled elections; additional special elections took place concurrently with these regularly-scheduled elections.

State summaries

New Jersey 
All seats of the New Jersey Senate and the New Jersey General Assembly were up for election. Senators were elected to four-year terms in single-member districts, while Assembly members were elected to two-year terms in two-member districts. Democrats retained majority control in both chambers.

Virginia 

All seats of the Virginia House of Delegates are up for election; the Virginia Senate will not hold regularly-scheduled elections in 2013. Delegates are elected to two-year terms in single-member districts. Republicans maintained a majority.

See Also
 2013 United States gubernatorial elections

Notes

References 

 
State legislative elections
State legislature elections in the United States by year